Across 110th Street is a 1972 American action-crime film directed by Barry Shear and starring Yaphet Kotto, Anthony Quinn, Anthony Franciosa and Paul Benjamin. The film is set in Harlem, New York and takes its name from 110th Street, the traditional dividing line between Harlem and Central Park that functioned as an informal boundary of race and class in 1970s New York City.

Focusing on a heist, murder and a subsequent investigation, Across 110th Street takes inspiration from both the blaxploitation films of the 1970s as well as the film noir genre. Across 110th Street is remembered in part for its soundtrack, which features a classic song of the same name by Bobby Womack.

Plot
Jim Harris goes with his partners to steal $300,000 from a Mafia-controlled policy bank in Harlem, disguised as police officers. The robbery goes wrong and results in the deaths of seven men — three black gangsters, two members of the Mafia, and two police officers. Lieutenant William Pope, a straitlaced black police officer is assigned to work the case with aging Captain Frank Mattelli, a streetwise but aging Italian-American cop.

Although Lieutenant Pope works strictly by the book and states that he is in charge of the investigation, he struggles to restrain Mattelli, who receives money from Doc Johnson, the leader of black organized crime in Harlem. Over the course of roughly twenty-four hours, Pope and Mattelli race to get to the criminals before they can be hunted down by the Mafia, which is also searching for Harris' crew. The Italians are led by Nick DiSalvio, a savage capo who plans to torture the robbers, when he finds them, to deter others from trying what they did.

Cast

Production 
Anthony Quinn, who also served as executive producer, originally wanted John Wayne and then Kirk Douglas for the lead role of Captain Mattelli. Both passed, as did Burt Lancaster, leaving Quinn to take the part. Additionally, he hoped to get Sidney Poitier to play Lt. Pope. Upon hearing the news, Harlem residents disagreed with the choice, claiming Poitier was too Hollywood and not urban enough for the role. Quinn relented, and Yaphet Kotto was chosen to play Pope.

When planning the film, director Barry Shear was adamant that only by filming in real locations could he bring a suitably raw and genuine feel to its themes of gang warfare and bloody street violence. Hollywood colleagues warned him that New York was the worst city in which to film, due to labor costs and permit nightmares, and Harlem the worst part of New York, due to its status at that time as the most lawless ghetto in the US. Undeterred, Shear took on Fouad Said, an unrivalled expert in location shooting, as a co-producer.

Said had cut his teeth as a cameraman on the TV series I Spy, which broke new ground for American television by mixing studio work with location footage shot all over the world; a feat made possible by abandoning the ubiquitous but unwieldy Mitchell cameras of the day in favor of the lightweight Arriflex 35 IIC. Said found out during principal photography that the first production model of the much-anticipated and groundbreaking Arriflex 35BL camera had just arrived in New York. Having established a long and successful relationship with ARRI over the I Spy years, Said persuaded Volker Bahnemann, at that time Vice President of the ARRI division in America, to allow his Across 110th Street crew one week to try out the 35BL, the first time the camera was used on a motion picture.

The camera immediately revolutionized what they were able to achieve on the streets of Harlem. It was self-blimped and featured a dual-compartment coaxial magazine positioned at its rear, for perfectly shoulder-balanced handheld shooting. "It's a real winner," affirmed cinematographer Jack Priestley ASC at the time. "It's as quiet as a church mouse and has great flexibility, especially as it weighs only 33 lbs. I don't know what I would have done in a lot of spots without it, especially in those small rooms where we often had to shoot. You put it on your shoulder and walk around, bend down, sit down, hold it in your lap—everything. I think it's going to help the film industry tremendously."

One week with the 35BL proved it to be such a valuable tool that Said negotiated keeping the camera for the last four weeks of filming. Camera operator Sol Negrin, later to become a respected cinematographer and ASC member, reported of the 35BL: "It was used in major sound sequences shot in confined quarters where it was impossible to use a large camera, but where we needed portability and quietness. We also used it on the rooftops of buildings in Little Italy—buildings that had no elevators. The low noise level of the Arriflex 35BL permits shooting sound sequences in confined quarters, thus eliminating the post-dubbing of dialogue that is usually necessary under such conditions."

A combination of Fouad Said's radical location skills and ARRI's groundbreaking technology allowed Shear's dream of a realistic backdrop for his story to be accomplished. A staggering 95% of the movie was shot at a total of 60 different interior and exterior locations in Harlem.

Themes

Racial tensions 
The late 1960s and early 1970s were a time when racial tensions ran deep, and often exploded into riots. In the summer of 1964, a riot erupted in Harlem after a white off-duty police officer shot and killed an armed black teenager in Yorkville, Manhattan. The "hot summer" of 1967 saw riots rip through the country, in major cities throughout the West and the North, as black communities responded in anger to poverty and police brutality. In 1968, just three years before the release of Across 110th Street, numerous businesses and storefronts in Harlem were set on fire as residents reacted in frustration and grief after the assassination of Martin Luther King Jr.

The 1970s were also a time when feelings of black power were everywhere in African-American communities across the United States. The black power ethos seeped even into the underworld of organized crime, as evident in Across 110th Street, where black gangsters like Doc Johnson are coming to believe that black people should control the organized crime circuits within their neighborhoods rather than the racist Mafia bosses.

New York City in the 1970s 
Across 110th Street portrays New York City of the 1970s, a decade when crime, drug use and poverty was at an all-time high. The city economy was broke, its infrastructure crumbling and pimps and prostitutes filled Times Square. Harlem itself was a place of little opportunity. Middle class residents fled the neighborhood in large numbers, leaving the poor to abandoned buildings and empty storefronts. Burned out buildings were visible on nearly every block of Harlem's major avenues, 24% of the area's population was living on welfare, and between 1976 and 1978 the population of east and central Harlem fell by almost a third. In 1971, an estimated 60% of Harlem's economic activity depended on cash flow from gambling — the illegal "numbers" racket controlled by organized crime.

During a potent scene in the film, Jim Harris explains to his girlfriend why he was forced to turn to robbery to make ends meet. As a middle-aged black man, formerly incarcerated, with a health problem and no formal education or highly-paid skills, Harris' only options are to work a demeaning, low-paying job with no future or to turn to crime. Even the cop Mattelli justifies the bribes he receives as supplemental income for his meager wages as a police officer.

Release
The film earned an estimated $3.4 million in North American rentals in 1973.

 In 1973 it was banned by the South African Publications Control Board.
 In 1984 it was released on VHS by Key Video, one of CBS/Fox's home video lines.
 In 2001 it was released on DVD.
 In 2010 it was digitized in High Definition (1080i) and broadcast on MGM HD.
 In September 2014 it was released on Blu-ray by Kino Lorber.

Reception 
Among contemporary reviews, Roger Greenspun of The New York Times wrote "It manages at once to be unfair to blacks, vicious towards whites and insulting to anyone who feels that race relations might consist of something better than improvised genocide ... By the time it is over virtually everybody has been killed—by various means, but mostly by a machine gun that makes lots of noise and splatters lots of blood and probably serves as the nearest substitute for an identifiable hero." Variety wrote that the film "is not for the squeamish. From the beginning it is a virtual blood bath. Those portions of it which aren't bloody violent are filled in by the squalid location sites in New York's Harlem or equally unappealing ghetto areas leaving no relief from depression and oppression. There's not even a glamorous or romantic type character or angle for audiences to fantasy-empathize with."

Gene Siskel gave the film one-and-a-half stars out of four and wrote "The film breaks no new ground, remaining content to combine familiar elements from 'In the Heat of the Night' (modern black cop vs. traditional white cop) and at least a half-dozen urban melodramas in which Italians and blacks go at each other with guns and mouths blazing." Gary Arnold of The Washington Post slammed the film as "a crime melodrama at once so tacky and so brutal that one feels tempted to swear out a warrant for the arrest of the filmmakers." Kevin Thomas of the Los Angeles Times wrote that the film "self-destructs by consistently selling out to stomach-churning displays of unrelieved violence... that the grisliness depicted so graphically in 'Across 110th Street' is true to life is undisputable; it's the manner and extent of its depiction on the screen that's deplorable."

In 1973, veteran black Chicago journalist Lu Palmer opened his alternative newspaper Black X-Press Info Paper with a review of Across 110th Street. He reflected that the film was particularly thoughtful and well-acted compared to many other low-budget blaxploitation pictures of the era and noted that "this flick ought to be carefully studied — again, for its images and messages."

Across 110th Street presently holds a score of 82% at Rotten Tomatoes, based on 17 reviews.

Soundtrack

The soundtrack of Across 110th Street reflects the mood and historical context of the film. The songs were written and performed by Bobby Womack, while the score was composed and conducted by J. J. Johnson. Made up of gritty and brooding funk, the soundtrack echoes the dark themes and imagery of the film.

The critically praised title song was a No. 19 hit on the Billboard Hot Soul Singles chart in 1973 and was later featured in Quentin Tarantino's 1997 blaxploitation homage Jackie Brown. Its lyrics reflect the broader themes of impoverishment and desperation in the film, where characters feel beaten down by poverty and must do whatever it takes to stay alive.

Track listing
 "Across 110th Street" (performed by Bobby Womack and Peace) (US #56, R&B #19)
 "Harlem Clavinette" (performed by J. J. Johnson and his Orchestra)
 "If You Don't Want My Love" (performed by Bobby Womack and Peace)
 "Hang On In There (instrumental)" (performed by J. J. Johnson and his Orchestra)
 "Quicksand" (performed by Bobby Womack and Peace)
 "Harlem Love Theme" (performed by J. J. Johnson and his Orchestra)
 "Across 110th Street (instrumental)" (performed by J. J. Johnson and his Orchestra)
 "Do It Right" (performed by Bobby Womack and Peace)
 "Hang On In There" (performed by Bobby Womack and Peace)
 "If You Don't Want My Love (instrumental)" (performed J. J. Johnson and his Orchestra)
 "Across 110th Street – Part II" (performed by Bobby Womack and Peace)

Personnel
 Unidentified orchestra including
 Carol Kaye – electric bass
 Emil Richards – percussion

See also
 List of American films of 1972
 List of hood films

References

External links
 .
 
 
 

1972 films
Blaxploitation films
1970s crime action films
1970s action thriller films
1970s crime thriller films
American crime action films
American action thriller films
American crime thriller films
Films about African-American organized crime
Films about the American Mafia
Films based on American thriller novels
Films set in Harlem
Films shot in New York City
Films about the New York City Police Department
Fictional portrayals of the New York City Police Department
American police detective films
United Artists films
United Artists Records soundtracks
1970s English-language films
Films directed by Barry Shear
1970s American films